Beast in Black is a Finnish power metal band that was founded in 2015 in Helsinki by guitarist and songwriter Anton Kabanen.

The musical influences of the band include Judas Priest, Manowar, W.A.S.P., Accept, and Black Sabbath.

History 
Anton Kabanen founded the band in 2015 after he left his former band Battle Beast earlier in the same year. Like Battle Beast, the band's name is a tribute to the Japanese manga and anime series Berserk.

Beast in Black signed with the Nuclear Blast label and released their first album, Berserker on November 3, 2017, which received a very positive response worldwide. The debut album ranked seventh on Finnish charts albums. In addition, Berserker also charted in Germany, United Kingdom, Sweden, Switzerland and France.

On February 7, 2018, it was announced that Atte Palokangas would replace Sami Hänninen as the permanent drummer. The band includes the Greek vocalist Yannis Papadopoulos (ex-Wardrum), the Hungarian bassist Mate Molnar (Wisdom) and Kasperi Heikkinen (former guitarist of bands like U.D.O., Amberian Dawn, etc.).

On March 21, 2018, it was announced that Beast in Black would be opening for Nightwish on the European leg of their Decades: World Tour.

The band's second album, From Hell with Love, was released on February 8, 2019. After the release of the album, the band did their first headline tour in Europe with the Finnish industrial metal band Turmion Kätilöt as support.

On October 26, 2021, Beast in Black released their third album, Dark Connection. In addition to Berserk, several songs in the album reference science fiction series such as Blade Runner, Armitage III, Bubblegum Crisis and Cyber City Oedo. The album charted in Finland, Sweden, Switzerland, the United States, United Kingdom, Germany and Japan, ranking first in Finland.

Members
Current members
Anton Kabanen – lead guitar, backing vocals, keyboards (2015–present)
Yannis Papadopoulos – lead vocals (2015–present)
Kasperi Heikkinen – rhythm guitar (2015–present)
Máté Molnár – bass (2015–present)
Atte Palokangas – drums (2018–present)

Former members
Sami Hänninen – drums (2015–2018)

Timeline

Discography

Albums
Berserker (2017)
From Hell with Love (2019)
Dark Connection (2021)

Singles
"Blind and Frozen" (2017)
"Beast in Black" (2017)
"Born Again" (2017)
"Zodd the Immortal" (2017)
"Sweet True Lies" (2018)
"Die by the Blade" (2019)
"From Hell with Love" (2019)
"Moonlight Rendezvous" (2021)
"One Night in Tokyo" (2021)
"Hardcore" (2021)

References

External links
 
 Metallum Archives

Finnish musical groups
Finnish power metal musical groups
Finnish heavy metal musical groups
Musical groups established in 2015
Musical groups from Helsinki
Musical quintets
Nuclear Blast artists